Chang Hong (also known as , given name Shu , 582? BC - 492 BC) was a native of Zizhou in the ancient region of Shu. He was a famous scholar, politician, educator and astronomer in ancient China. He was well-versed in chronology, astronomy and was proficient in musical theory. .

He was murdered by Zhao Jianzi. Zhuangzi claimed that his blood turned into green jade three years after his death. To this day, the Chinese still use the expression  to refer to the sacrifices or wrongful deaths of upright people.

References

Zhou dynasty people
492 BC deaths